The Inter-University Council for East Africa (IUCEA), is an institution of the East African Community, which is a regional intergovernmental organisation of the republics of Kenya, Tanzania, Uganda, Burundi, Rwanda and South Sudan. IUCEA aims to foster collaboration between universities in the EAC region. It has its head offices in Kampala, Uganda

Historical background 

In East Africa regional higher education interactions and cooperation originates from the pre-independence era when Makerere University College was the only higher education institution in the region serving students from Kenya, the then Tanganyika, and Zanzibar in East Africa as well as from the then Rhodesia and Nyasaland in central and southern Africa, which now consist of Malawi, Zambia and Zimbabwe. Later in 1963, university colleges were formed in Nairobi and Dar es Salaam as constituent colleges of the then University of East Africa that had been established during the era of independence of the four countries (Uganda, Kenya, Zanzibar and Tanganyika). Makerere College was the third constituent college of the University of East Africa.

In 1970, the University of East Africa was dissolved and the University of Dar es Salaam, Makerere University and the University of Nairobi were established as separate national universities for Tanzania, Uganda and Kenya respectively. In the same year, due to the need to maintain collaboration between these universities the Inter-University Committee (IUC) was established under the auspices of the first EAC. The role of IUC was to facilitate contact and cooperation among the three universities (University of Dar es Salaam, Makerere University and University of Nairobi). IUC was hosted in Kampala, Uganda. In 1977, the former EAC collapsed and the support that IUC was receiving from the Partner States declined. However, IUC continued to coordinate cooperation between the three universities albeit with resource constraints that severely limited its functions.

Establishment of IUCEA 

In 1980, after consultations involving permanent/principal secretaries responsible for higher education in Uganda, Tanzania and Kenya, the vice chancellors of the universities in the three countries met in Nairobi (Kenya) to discuss the future of the cooperation of their institutions. They agreed to sign a memorandum of understanding (MoU) committing them to maintain cooperation between their universities within the IUC framework. The MoU was subsequently signed, which also led to the transformation of IUC into the current Inter-university Council for East Africa (IUCEA). The MoU spelt out the objectives, functions, membership and governance of IUCEA, and, just like IUC, IUCEA continued and still is hosted in Kampala, Uganda. IUCEA played its role very well until 1992 when decline in financial support from the three governments of Kenya, Tanzania and Uganda made it impossible to carry out the collaborative activities. This raised concern about institutional sustainability and hence prompted a study by the Commonwealth Higher Education Management Services (CHEMS) between November 1998 and March 1999 with a view to revitalizing IUCEA. The aim of the study was to develop a viable strategy for expansion and sustainability of IUCEA.

Revitalized IUCEA and Integration into EAC Framework 

The Treaty for the Establishment of the current East African Community (The Treaty) was signed on 30 November 1999 and entered into force on 7 July 2000 following its ratification by the original three Partner States, namely Republic of Kenya, Republic of Uganda, and United Republic of Tanzania. The Republic of Burundi and the Republic of Rwanda acceded to the EAC Treaty on 18 June 2007 and became full Members of the Community with effect from 1 July 2007. Upon its re-establishment, EAC recognized IUCEA as one of the surviving institutions of the former Community. Therefore, it was agreed to establish IUCEA as an institution of the new EAC. In that process in 2000 IUCEA underwent revitalization following the recommendations of the CHEMS study and in 2002 the Ministers responsible for Higher Education of Kenya, Tanzania and Uganda signed the IUCEA Protocol as an instrument that made IUCEA a legal body corporate of EAC.

The IUCEA Act, 2009 

In 2009 the East African Legislative Assembly (EALA) enacted the IUCEA Act 2009, thus effectively integrating IUCEA into the EAC operational framework. The Act spells out the objectives, functions, institutional set up and systems of governance and management of IUCEA. According to the Act any university, university college and degree awarding institution may apply for and get admitted to the IUCEA membership as long as it is properly incorporated in the EAC Partner State where it is operating and is pursuing objectives that are consistent with the functions of IUCEA as spelt out in the Act.

External links
 IUCEA website

Education in Kenya
Education in Tanzania
Education in Uganda
Education in Rwanda
Education in South Sudan
Educational organisations based in South Sudan
Educational organisations based in Burundi
Educational organisations based in Uganda
Organisations based in Kampala